Olaf Prenzler (born 2 April 1958) is an East German former sprinter who specialised in the 100 and 200 metres.

Career
Prenzler was born in 1958 in Kästorf near Gifhorn in Lower Saxony, Germany. He was a European Junior silver medallist in the 100 metres in 1977. In 1979 he was the East German 100 metres champion; he also won the national 200 metres in 1978, and 1983.

Prenzler was the East German indoor 200 metres champion on three occasions.

At the 1978 European Championships he won silver medals in the 200 metres and in the 4 × 100 metres relay, the latter with teammates Manfred Kokot, Eugen Ray and Alexander Thieme.

He participated in the 1980 Summer Olympics, in the 200 metres but was eliminated in the semi-finals.

At the 1982 European Championships he won the Gold in the 200 metres. In the 4 × 100 metres relay he won a silver medal with teammates Thomas Munkelt, Detlef Kübeck and Frank Emmelmann.

He won a silver medal in 200 m at the 1985 European Indoor Championships.

At the 1986 European Championships he  finished sixth in 100 m and seventh in 200 m. He then won another silver medal in the 4 × 100 metres relay with teammates Thomas Schröder, Steffen Bringmann and Frank Emmelmann.

He represented the sports team SC Magdeburg and became East German champion in 1978 (200 m), 1979 (100 m) and 1983 (200 m). In July 1982 he helped established an East German relay record with 38.28 seconds.

References

1958 births
Living people
East German male sprinters
Athletes (track and field) at the 1980 Summer Olympics
Olympic athletes of East Germany
European Athletics Championships medalists
People from Gifhorn
Friendship Games medalists in athletics